The Egypt women's national youth handball team represents Egypt in Women's Youth Handball. It is administered  by the Egyptian Handball Federation. It is the most successful team in the continent, holding 4 continental wins followed by Angola with 3 continental wins.

African Women's Championship record

World Championship record

References

Women's national youth handball teams
Handball in Egypt